Catenicella is a genus of marine bryozoans belonging to the family Catenicellidae. Bryozoans are colonial animals that live in aquatic environments, and Catenicella is no exception. Members of this genus are found in oceans around the world, with a particularly high diversity in the Arctic and Antarctic regions.

Description 
Catenicella colonies are made up of tiny, interconnected zooids, each with a circular or oval-shaped operculum (a protective lid that can be closed to protect the animal inside). The colonies form thin sheets or branching structures that attach to hard substrates such as rocks or shells. The colonies themselves can range in color from white to yellow, pink, or brown.

Like other bryozoans, Catenicella zooids are filter feeders, meaning they feed on small particles in the water such as plankton or detritus. They use hair-like structures called cilia to create a current that draws water and food into the colony, where it is captured by specialized feeding structures called lophophores.

Species 
There are currently around 60 recognized species of Catenicella, with new species still being discovered and described. Some notable species include:

 Catenicella caespitosa: This species is found in the Arctic and Antarctic regions, where it forms dense, branched colonies on rocks and shells.
 Catenicella elegans: Found in the Mediterranean and Caribbean seas, this species forms delicate, feathery colonies with a distinctive pink coloration.
 Catenicella lapidosa: This species is found in the Indo-Pacific region, where it forms thin, encrusting colonies on coral reefs.
 Catenicella murrayi: This species is found in the North Atlantic, where it forms bushy, branched colonies on rocks and shells.
 Catenicella pertusa: This species is found in the North Atlantic, where it forms encrusting colonies on rocks and other hard substrates.

Importance 
Catenicella and other bryozoans play important roles in marine ecosystems. They are important contributors to marine biodiversity, providing habitat and food for a variety of other organisms. Some species of Catenicella, such as C. caespitosa, are particularly important in the Arctic and Antarctic regions, where they form large, complex colonies that provide habitat for a wide variety of marine life.

In addition to their ecological importance, some species of Catenicella have also been studied for their potential medical applications. For example, compounds derived from C. elegans have been shown to have antibacterial and antifungal properties, and may have potential as new antibiotics.

Species 
 Catenicella buskii Wyville Thomson, 1858  
 Catenicella castanea Wyville Thomson, 1858  
 Catenicella constans (Powell, 1967)  
 Catenicella contei (Audouin, 1826)  
 Catenicella cylindriformis (Harmer, 1957)  
 Catenicella dawsoni Wyville Thomson, 1858  
 Catenicella delicatula (Wilson, 1880)  
 Catenicella elegans Busk, 1852 
 Catenicella formosa Busk, 1852  
 Catenicella fusca MacGillivray, 1884  
 Catenicella gibbosa Busk, 1852  
 Catenicella glabrosa Branch & Hayward, 2005  
 Catenicella gracilenta MacGillivray, 1885  
 Catenicella hannafordi MacGillivray, 1869  
 Catenicella imperfecta (Harmer, 1957)  
 Catenicella longicaudata (Harmer, 1957)  
 Catenicella marceli Gluhak, Lewis & Popijak, 2007  
 Catenicella paradoxa Rosso, 2009  
 Catenicella pseudoelegans Gordon, 2009
 Catenicella ringens Busk, 1852  
 Catenicella tenella (Harmer, 1957)  
 Catenicella teres (MacGillivray, 1895)  
 Catenicella triangulifera (Harmer, 1957)  
 Catenicella tuberculifera (Harmer, 1957)  
 Catenicella uberrima (Harmer, 1957)  
 Catenicella utriculus MacGillivray, 1884
 Catenicella venusta Macgillivray, 1887

See also 
 List of prehistoric bryozoans

References

External links 
 

Bryozoan genera
Cheilostomatida